Mark Michael Flatts (born 14 October 1972) is an English former footballer who played in midfield. He started out in the top flight as a trainee with Arsenal.

Playing career
Born in Haringey, London, England, Flatts was a trainee with Arsenal, making his debut against Sheffield United on 19 September 1992. He played 18 games in all competitions for Arsenal between 1992 and 1996. During his Arsenal career, he had loan spells at Cambridge United, Brighton & Hove Albion, Bristol City and Grimsby Town.

He was released by Arsenal in 1996 and had trials at various clubs including Torino and in England. He was signed by former Arsenal player Martin Hayes at Bishop's Stortford.

External links

Arseweb profile

1972 births
Living people
English footballers
Arsenal F.C. players
Cambridge United F.C. players
Brighton & Hove Albion F.C. players
Bristol City F.C. players
Grimsby Town F.C. players
Premier League players
English Football League players
Association football midfielders